The Utah Division of Juvenile Justice Services (JJS) is a division of the Utah Department of Human Services operating juvenile correctional services. Its headquarters is in Salt Lake City.

The division was established in 1981 as the Utah Division of Youth Corrections. It received its current name on July 1, 2004.

Facilities
Secure facilities:
 Decker Lake Youth Center (West Valley City)
 Farmington Bay Youth Center (Farmington)
 Mill Creek Youth Center (Ogden)
 Slate Canyon Youth Center (Provo)
 South West Utah Youth Center (Cedar City)
 Wasatch Youth Center (Unincorporated Salt Lake County, near Salt Lake City)
 Split Mountain Youth Center (Vernal)

References

External links

 Utah Division of Juvenile Justice Services

Juvenile justice
Juvenile detention centers in the United States
State corrections departments of the United States
Juvenile Justice
1981 establishments in Utah
Government agencies established in 1981